Georgy Ivanovich Shayduko (6 August 1962 – 8 January 2023) was a Russian Olympic sailor. Shayduko was born in Nikopol on 6 August 1962. He won silver medal in the Soling class at 1996 Summer Olympics. Shayduko died of a cardiac arrest on 9 January 2023, at the age of 60.

References

External links
 
 
 

1962 births
2023 deaths
Soviet male sailors (sport)
Russian male sailors (sport)
Russian people of Ukrainian descent
Sailors at the 1988 Summer Olympics – Soling
Sailors at the 1992 Summer Olympics – Flying Dutchman
Sailors at the 1996 Summer Olympics – Soling
Sailors at the 2000 Summer Olympics – Soling
Olympic sailors of the Soviet Union
Olympic sailors of the Unified Team
Olympic sailors of Russia
Olympic silver medalists for Russia
People from Nikopol, Ukraine
Olympic medalists in sailing
Medalists at the 1996 Summer Olympics
European Champions Soling
Soling class world champions